Brawn is a meat dish.

Brawn may also refer to:
 Amadeus Cho, a fictional superhero from Marvel Comics
 Brawn (Transformers), a fictional character from the various Transformers universes
 Brawn (surname), a family name
 Physical strength, the capacity for muscular force
 An episode of the television series The Batman
 Brawn GP, a former Formula One team

See also
 Braun (disambiguation)
 Brown (disambiguation)